William Wakeman may refer to:

 William Frederick Wakeman, archaeologist
William Wakeman (The Reaping)

See also
Polly and William Wakeman House